Aapchaur is a hill village in Gulmi District, central Nepal, roughly 10 kilometres northeast of Tamghas and 30 kilometres southwest of Baglung. Overlooking a river valley, this village area was the cradle of the Nepalese coffee industry when it was first planted by a Hindu holy man using seeds from Burma in 1937.

References

Populated places in Gulmi District